New Zealand State Highway 43 (SH 43), also called the Forgotten World Highway, is a road that runs 148 km from Stratford in Taranaki to Taumarunui in the King Country. It contains the only unsealed portion of the New Zealand state highway network.

Route description
The road passes through small towns such as Toko, Douglas, Te Wera, Pohukura, Strathmore, Whangamōmona, Marco, Koruatahi, Tahora, Tatu, and 10 km off the highway is Ohura. In the 1920s the Stratford–Okahukura Line was built. Many of the ghost towns are from the railway days.

Driving the highway takes up to 3 hours, as it passes through rugged countryside. It climbs three saddles: the Strathmore Saddle, Whangamōmona Saddle, and Tahora Saddle. 14 km past Whangamōmona is the Moki Tunnel, also known as Hobbit's Hole. Near one end of the Moki Tunnel is the turn off for the Mount Damper Falls, the fourth-highest in the North Island, and past the other end is the Tangarakau Gorge, with walls just under 60m high.

 of the road through Tarangakau Gorge is unsealed. This makes SH 43 the only state highway that currently has an unsealed section. A 2017 report stated that sealing the Tangarakau Gorge road would cost approximately $7m. In December 2019, the government allocated funding to seal the final section of unsealed highway.

Route changes

Dangers
SH 43 has been ranked as one of the 10 worst roads in New Zealand by the Police. The slippery gravel surface in the Tangarakau Gorge is the main cause of the highway's bad safety record. This section is now scheduled to be sealed however, because of the increasing traffic volume and increased tourism interest. Some local residents have in the past, protested the condition of the unsealed road; in 2016 homemade signs proclaimed the road "closed".

Culture
The road runs through the Republic of Whangamomona, a locality that declared itself a republic in 1989 after a revision in district boundaries forced it out of Taranaki.

See also
 List of New Zealand state highways

References

External links
 New Zealand Transport Agency

43
New Plymouth District
Taranaki
Transport in Taranaki